The Silver Bauhinia Star (SBS) is the second Bauhinia Star rank in the honours system of Hong Kong, awarded to people who have taken a leading part in public affairs or voluntary work over a long period. The award was created in 1997 to replace the British honours system (such as Order of the British Empire) after the transfer of sovereignty to People's Republic of China and the establishment of the Hong Kong Special Administrative Region.

List of recipients

1998

1999

2000

2001

2002

2003

2004

2005

2006

2007

2008

2009

2010

2011

2012

2013

2014

2015

2016

2017

2018

2019

2020

2021

2022

See also

Bronze Bauhinia Star
Gold Bauhinia Star
Orders, decorations, and medals of Hong Kong

References

External links

Recipients of Hong Kong Special Administrative Region Honours and Awards

Orders, decorations, and medals of Hong Kong
Lists of Hong Kong people
Awards established in 1997